Richard J. Coggins (10 June 1929 – 19 November 2017) was a British biblical commentator, notable for his contributions to The Cambridge Bible Commentaries.

Life

Coggins graduated from Exeter College, Oxford in 1950 and after training for the priesthood in the Church of England at St Stephen's House, Oxford served a curacy in the Diocese of Exeter. He spent five years in Oxford as a tutor and chaplain at St Stephen's House before joining King's College London as a Lecturer in Old Testament studies in 1962. He retired as a senior lecturer in 1994. Among his students during his early years at King's was the future Archbishop Desmond Tutu.

Coggins was public preacher at the Anglican Diocese of Southwark and belonged to St Matthew, Brixton.<ref name="Coggins">{{Cite book|title=Who's Who in the Bible|author= Richard Coggins|publisher= Batsford|location= London|page=Dust jacket|date=1981|ISBN= 0-7134-0144-3}}</ref> In his retirement he moved to Lymington in Hampshire.

On 4 March 1994 a day conference was held in honour of Richard Coggins and his colleague Leslie Houlden to mark their retirement from King's College London; the speaker in honour of Coggins was the Old Testament scholar Robert P. Carroll.

A memorial service for Richard Coggins was held in the chapel of King's College London on 22 May 2018; the address was provided by the Old Testament scholar Paul Joyce.

Works
 Samaritans and Jews: The Origins of Samaritanism Reconsidered (1975)
 The Books of Ezra and Nehemiah (Cambridge Bible Commentary) (1976) 
 The First and Second Books of the Chronicles (Cambridge Bible Commentary) (1976) 
 The First and Second Books of Esdras (Cambridge Bible Commentary) (with Michael Knibb) (1979)
 Who's Who in the Bible (1981)
 Israel's Prophetic Tradition: Essays in Honour of Peter R. Ackroyd (edited, with Anthony Phillips and Michael Knibb) (1982)
 Nahum, Obadiah, Esther: Israel among the Nations (International Theological Commentary) (with S. Paul Re'emi) (1986)
 Introducing the Old Testament (1990)
  
 A Dictionary of the Bible (with W.R.F. Browning and Graham N. Stanton) (1996)
 Sirach (Guides to the Apocrypha and Pseudepigrapha) (1998)
 Exodus (Epworth Commentaries) (2000)
 Isaiah (Oxford Bible Commentary) (2001)
 Six Minor Prophets Through the Centuries: Nahum, Habakkuk, Zephaniah, Haggai, Zechariah and Malachi'' (Wiley Blackwell Bible Commentaries) (with Jin H Han) (2011)

References

1929 births
2017 deaths
Bible commentators
Academics of King's College London
Presidents of the Society for Old Testament Study